Saku Laaksonen (born 8 August 1970) is a retired Finnish football midfielder. He played 12 seasons in highest tier of finnish football.

Honours

As a player 
FC Jazz
 Veikkausliiga: 1996

References

1971 births
Living people
Finnish footballers
FC Jazz players
Myllykosken Pallo −47 players
FC Lahti players
Association football midfielders
Finland international footballers
Musan Salama players
Sportspeople from Pori